Pir-e-Kamil or Peer-e-Kamil (meaning  "The Perfect Mentor") is a novel written by Pakistani writer Umera Ahmad. It was first published in Urdu in 2004 and later in English in 2011. The book deals with the turning points in intervening lives of two people: a runaway girl named Imama Hashim; and a boy named Salar Sikander with an IQ of more than 150.  The story spans a time period of around ten years. It is Ahmad's most popular work. It is followed by a sequel, Aab-e-Hayat.

Plot summary

The story's protagonist, Imama Hashim, belongs to an influential Ahmadiyya Muslim family living in Islamabad. She decides to convert to Sunni Islam after being influenced by her friends. She attends her senior shabiha's lectures in secrecy from her family and her roommates, Javeria and Rabia. While studying in a medical school in Lahore, she falls in love with her friend Zainab's elder brother, doctor Jalal Ansar. But Imama's family tries to coerce her into marrying her first cousin Asjad, which is unacceptable to her, her parents respond by grounding her and taking away her cellphone.

Imama seeks help from Salar whom she is antagonistic with since she is a religious girl and Salar is not.  He is a rich boy with an IQ level above 150. Imama wishes to marry Jalal, but Salar lies to her that Jalal has married someone else.  Imama is saddened and asks Salar to marry her so that her family will not be able to force her. Salar helps her and marries her, but soon after loses contact with her.

Imama finds a sanctuary under Sibt-e-Ali and his family.  She changes her name and completes her studies and starts working in a pharmaceutical company in Lahore. She hates Salar because he refused to divorce her as he had promised.

Salar later travels to New Haven for education, then he works for United Nations for some time before permanently settling in Lahore. Salar finally sees the errors of his ways and changes for good.  Later, the scene shifts near to Kaaba, where Salar and Imama are sitting together worshiping God.  Salar realizes that God has given him a blessed woman to be his companion, and vows to protect her.

Characters

Protagonists
Imama Hashim - A Ahmadi Muslim girl who converts to Sunni Islam.          
Salar Sikander - Imama's rich neighbour, who has an IQ of above 150.

Major characters
Waseem - Imama's brother. 
Jalal - A doctor and older brother of Zainab. 
Hashim Mubeen - Father of Imama and Waseem. 
Sikander Usman - Salar's father. 
Tayyaba - Salar's mother and Sikander Usman's wife. 
Saad Zafar - A friend of Salar in New Haven. 
Dr Furqan - A devoted Muslim and doctor. 
Dr Sibt-e-Ali - An Islamic scholar in Lahore. 
Saeeda Amma - First cousin of Sibt-e-Ali.

References

External links
Pir-e-Kamil  (The Perfect Mentor) Read Online

Urdu-language fiction
2004 novels
Novels set in Pakistan
Ahmadiyya in Pakistan
Urdu-language novels
Ferozsons books
Novels set in Lahore